This article lists the complete results of the group stage of the 2013 Sudirman Cup Group 1 in Kuala Lumpur, Malaysia.

Group 1A

China vs India

Indonesia vs India

China vs Indonesia

Group 1B

Thailand vs Hong Kong

Korea vs Hong Kong

Thailand vs Korea

Group 1C

Malaysia vs Chinese Taipei

Germany vs Chinese Taipei

Malaysia vs Germany

Group 1D

References

Sudirman Cup
Sudirman Cup Group 1
Sudirman Cup Group 1
Badminton tournaments in Malaysia
Sport in Kuala Lumpur
International sports competitions hosted by Malaysia